Time in Turkmenistan is given by Turkmenistan Time (TMT) (UTC+05:00). Turkmenistan does not currently observe daylight saving time.

References